Robert Earl Walden (March 9, 1938 – August 27, 2018) was an American professional football player who was a punter in the National Football League (NFL) and Canadian Football League (CFL). Walden played for 17 seasons, 14 of which were played in the NFL from 1964 to 1977. Previously, Walden had played three years in the CFL from 1961-1963. Walden was a part of the Pittsburgh Steelers' Super Bowl IX and Super Bowl X winning teams.

He led the NFL in punting in 1964 with a 46.4 yard average and was selected to the Pro Bowl after the 1969 season.

Before his NFL career, Walden led the CFL in punting, rushing, and receiving as a member of the Edmonton Eskimos in 1961 and 1962. 

Walden played for the University of Georgia Bulldogs for three years from 1958-1960. In 1958, as a sophomore, he led the nation in average yards per punt. In 1960, he set an Orange Bowl record for yards per punt.

References

http://www.iveyfuneral.com/obituary/robert-e-bobby-walden

1938 births
2018 deaths
American football punters
American players of Canadian football
Canadian football punters
Eastern Conference Pro Bowl players
Edmonton Elks players
Georgia Bulldogs football players
Hamilton Tiger-Cats players
Minnesota Vikings players
People from Thomas County, Georgia
Pittsburgh Steelers players
Players of American football from Georgia (U.S. state)